The Gauteng Division of the High Court of South Africa is a superior court of law which has general jurisdiction over the South African province of Gauteng and the eastern part of North West province. The main seat of the division is at Pretoria, while a local seat at Johannesburg has concurrent jurisdiction over the southern parts of Gauteng. Dunstan Mlambo has been the Judge President of the division since 1 November 2012.

History
A High Court was established for the South African Republic (the Transvaal Republic) in 1877, while the Witwatersrand gold fields were visited by a circuit court subordinate to the High Court. Both courts ceased to exist as a result of the British victory in the Second Anglo-Boer War. In 1902, two superior courts were established for the new Transvaal Colony: the Supreme Court of the Transvaal in Pretoria, and subordinate to it the High Court of Witwatersrand in Johannesburg. On the creation of the Union of South Africa these courts became the Transvaal Provincial Division and the Witwatersrand Local Division, respectively, of the Supreme Court of South Africa.

The Transvaal Provincial Division's area of jurisdiction was reduced in 1977 and 1979 when Bophuthatswana and Venda became nominally independent and established their own supreme courts. When the current Constitution of South Africa came into force in 1997 the Transvaal and Witwatersrand Divisions of the Supreme Court of South Africa and the Supreme Courts of Bophuthatswana and Venda all became High Courts. In 2001 some districts in North West were removed from the jurisdiction of the Transvaal Division and placed under the Bophuthatswana Division in Mafikeng. In 2009 the Transvaal and Witwatersrand divisions were renamed the North Gauteng and South Gauteng High Courts, respectively. In 2013, in the restructuring brought about by the Superior Courts Act, the courts became two seats of a single Gauteng Division of the High Court of South Africa.

Seats

List of Judges President

References

External links
 Decisions handed down up to 2009
 Decisions handed down at Pretoria since 2009
 Decisions handed down at Johannesburg since 2009

High Court of South Africa
Government of Gauteng
Organisations based in Pretoria
1877 establishments in the South African Republic
Courts and tribunals established in 1877